Marti Webb (born 13 December 1943) is an English actress and singer, who appeared on stage in Evita, before starring in Andrew Lloyd Webber's one-woman show Tell Me on a Sunday in 1980. This included her biggest hit single, "Take That Look Off Your Face", a UK top three hit, with the parent album also reaching the top three.

Early life and education
Marti Webb was born in Hampstead to Cecil (a clockmaker) and Selina Elizabeth Webb, and raised in Cricklewood. Her parents took her to variety shows and pantomimes as a child. Her father played the violin and her mother sang and played the piano. She attended dance lessons from the age of 3 and first performed in public at the age of 7, at the Scala Theatre, London, initially hoping to be a ballerina.

After a school teacher suggested to her parents that her natural talent for singing and dancing should be nurtured, she was educated at the Aida Foster stage school from the age of 12, where she eventually became Head Girl. Her mother had to take an additional job to order to pay for the school fees. While training, she appeared in BBC Schools programmes. Webb later commented that, having come from a normal school, she found it a shock to be asked to perform in front of her classmates.

The first musical she saw was Lionel Bart's Fings Ain't Wot They Used T'Be as some of her fellow students were performing in it. The school would send students for auditions regularly, which led to an audition for the original London production of Bye Bye Birdie, although she wasn't offered a role. She also auditioned for Oscar Hammerstein II for The Sound of Music, but being overcome by shyness, spoke very quietly and wasn't cast in the show.

She was selected to take part in the television programme Carol Levis' Junior Discoveries, which was broadcast from the Hackney Empire, for which she sang "Musetta's Waltz" from La Boheme.

Career

Musical theatre

West End debut in Stop the World, I Want to Get Off 
Aged 15, she appeared as Moonbeam in the 1959 Manchester production of Listen to the Wind by Vivian Ellis whilst still a student, before leaving school to make her West End debut in Stop the World, I Want to Get Off, a show that starred and had lyrics by Anthony Newley. She first discovered her belt voice while rehearsing for the show.

Webb performed "Almost Like Being in Love" as her audition piece, before a group that included Newley, Lionel Bart, Lionel Blair and Alma Cogan. The group shared a joke during her audition which distracted her and at the end of the piece, she grabbed her music and went to leave the stage. Newley had to stop her to ask for another song and she was so embarrassed, she dropped her sheet music across the stage. Newley later remarked that he'd loved her from that moment on. The company would go out together to watch other shows and performers, including Lotte Lenya and Ethel Merman.

First lead in Half a Sixpence 
Webb first came to prominence as Ann Pornick in the original London production of Half a Sixpence opposite Tommy Steele, citing her first leading role as a career highlight. The playwright Beverley Cross's father George was the company manager on the production of Stop the World, I Want to Get Off and recommended his son audition Webb for the role. She was offered the role after thirteen auditions and later dubbed the singing voice of Julia Foster, her replacement for the film adaptation. Webb later commented of Foster, "She has quite a notable voice, so it's not too hard to pick it up."

She also played Nancy in the first UK tour of Oliver! where she met and befriended the show's Assistant Stage Manager Cameron Mackintosh, who was to become one of the most prominent musical theatre producers in the world. Lionel Bart, the show's composer and lyricist, saw it numerous times whilst the production was in Manchester, where he was working on the notorious flop, Twang!!. When it returned to the West End Phil Collins, who later achieved fame with Genesis and had been one of the original Dodgers, rejoined the production to play Noah Claypole. On the production's transfer to the West End in April 1967, Barry Humphries played Fagin.

During the 1970s, Webb carved out a career as a respected, though not yet famous, West End actress and singer. In 1971, she was one of the original company of the London production of Godspell, the musical based on the Gospel of Matthew, opposite David Essex, Julie Covington and Jeremy Irons. The original London cast recording of the production includes her performance of "Bless the Lord".

She later played Nellie Cotterill in the 1973 original London production of The Card, a musical written by Tony Hatch and Jackie Trent which chronicled the rise of the title character from washerwoman's son to mayor of a Northern British town through initiative, guile, and luck.

The production was short-lived but was followed by the 1974 original London production of The Good Companions, alongside John Mills, Judi Dench and Christopher Gable in which she played Susie Dean, a member of a touring concert party. She was flown to Manchester to join the show during its tryout when the original actress Celia Bannerman, whose voice had proved unsuitable for the role, left the production.

Evita and Tell Me on a Sunday
After failing to land any stage roles as the decade wore on, by 1978 a somewhat dejected Webb was working in a travel agency and had stopped auditioning. A British lyricist came into the agency and encouraged her to start auditioning again, and within three months she was cast in Evita.

In early 1979, Webb was flown to New York to audition for Harold Prince after Gary Bond, then playing Che in the show, suggested her to the producers of Evita as a successor to Elaine Paige who was, at the time, expected to transfer to the recreate the role on Broadway. Prince was impressed and persuaded her to cover while Paige holidayed and sign up as a regular alternate for the remainder of Paige's contract, performing two shows a week, in preparation for succeeding Paige as the star. This began an arrangement which existed for the remainder of the show's run, with Stephanie Lawrence appearing as Webb's alternate before succeeding her.

At her original audition, show's composer Andrew Lloyd Webber had asked whether she would be interested if he wrote anything he thought appropriate for her voice. Assuming it was a kindly rejection, she was later surprised to be invited for a meal at Mr. Chow, a London restaurant, with Lloyd Webber and the lyricist Don Black to discuss the concept of a song cycle inspired by the story of a friend of the writers who had moved from London to the United States to begin a new life.

Webb was asked to collaborate on the piece when only two songs, the title piece "Tell Me on a Sunday" and "It's Not the End of the World", had been written, so the rest was created specifically with her voice and character in mind. Black, who became her manager and a close friend, said of her performance, "She was 'the girl', and that was it." Her tendency to, "Talk for hours about the most boring everyday things, like the gas or insurance", also inspired him in creating the narrative pieces in the song cycle which were letters to the character's mum.

She worked on the piece with Lloyd Webber and Black each day before being driven from Sydmonton Court, Lloyd Webber's country house, to the Prince Edward Theatre where Evita was playing. An album was recorded and it was performed at the 1979 Sydmonton Festival, the composer's annual workshop for new works, where a BBC Television producer contracted the collaborators to produce a version for television featuring Webb backed by a band and the London Philharmonic Orchestra. A one-off performance in January 1980 was recorded at the Royalty Theatre, London. Black recalls, "It was fantastic on television because it was almost all filmed in close-up on Marti Webb's face. Every eyebrow raised, every look registered. It was a brilliant piece of TV, like one of Alan Bennett's Talking Heads series, but sung."

Recorded in the autumn of 1979, the album of Tell Me on a Sunday was released and the television programme aired in February 1980 just as Webb took over the eponymous role in Evita. It was a No. 2 hit in the UK Albums Chart, and saw Webb become a household name. The lead single, "Take That Look Off Your Face" was a similar success, reaching No. 3 in the UK Singles Chart.

Webb has a distinctive, untrained voice and Lloyd Webber was said to have told her "You sing in my keys". She agreed, "You write in mine." She has since regularly performed at his Sydmonton Festival. He produced her second solo album Won't Change Places (1981) which featured the lead single "Your Ears Should Be Burning Now".

In January 2014, Webb again performed Tell Me on a Sunday initially for a week at the St. James Theatre, London, then for a fortnight at the Duchess Theatre.

Contrary to the 2004 revival, the show featured largely the original 1979 album tracks, with a few lyric amendments, plus the song "The Last Man in My Life", written for the show's incarnation as Song and Dance in 1982. The production came about after Webb met a commissioning editor for BBC Radio 2 at a concert honouring Don Black in late 2013 at which she'd performed two songs from the piece. Asked whether she could still do the whole show, she suggested that, with a small band, it could be recorded for radio broadcast. The producer Robert Mackintosh then suggested a week's run prior to the recording, the popularity of which led to another three weeks at a second theatre. The recording was broadcast on BBC Radio 2, alongside an interview with Lloyd Webber and Black conducted by Anneka Rice.

Webb later performed the show for two nights at the Kenton Theatre, Henley-on-Thames, in September 2015.

Work with Don Black
At the meal to discuss the Tell Me on a Sunday project, Lloyd Webber asked Don Black, who had maintained parallel careers as a lyricist and as the manager to Matt Monro, to become Webb's personal manager, a role he undertook from 1979 until the early 1990s, when he became too busy with work on Sunset Boulevard. He found her a new manager and they've remained close: "Uncle Don and Auntie Shirl have always been there for me."

During 1981 and 1982, Webb recorded her next album, I'm Not That Kind of Girl, which was eventually released in 1983. Although not based on a musical, the album had a running story concerning a woman who is reunited with a former lover. The album culminates with her on the way to their wedding. The songs were composed by David Hentschel and Don Black and were very much in a contemporary pop vein. Phil Collins played drums on the album and Kiki Dee contributed backing vocals. Despite the album's strong pedigree in terms of personnel, it failed to chart and was Webb's final album on the Polydor label.

In 1985 she scored her next big hit when she recorded a cover version of Black's song, "Ben", which had been originally released by Michael Jackson. It was produced in memory of Ben Hardwick, who died shortly after becoming Britain's youngest liver transplant patient and whose story was publicised on the BBC television programme That's Life!. The single reached No. 5 in the UK Singles Chart and was included on her 1985 album, Encore. In 1986, Black wrote lyrics to the theme of the BBC television drama Howards' Way and the single "Always There" was the result, produced by its composers Simon May and Leslie Osbourne. It became a UK top 20 hit, and inspired an album of the same name in which she covered other television themes. The album, which peaked at No. 65 in the UK Albums Chart, was later released on compact disc entitled Marti Webb Sings Small Screen Themes. The previous year, Webb had recorded the theme to the ITV television series To Have and To Hold, but for contractual reasons, the theme was re-recorded and released by the composer Johnny Worth's wife Catherine Stock. Webb, herself, re-recorded it for the Always There album.

She presented a BBC Radio 2 documentary about the career of Don Black that was broadcast in early 1995, appeared in a concert tribute to him on his 70th birthday that was broadcast on BBC Radio 2 in August 2008, performed at a BBC Electric Proms event with the lyricist in October 2009 and sang two songs during another concert tribute in 2013.

Later career
In 1982 Tell Me on a Sunday was combined with Lloyd Webber's other successful album Variations, which had featured his brother, cellist Julian Lloyd Webber, to create the show Song and Dance. The first act saw Webb reprise her role as the unnamed girl. In the second act Wayne Sleep and a dance troupe performed choreographed routines to the music from Variations. The pair toured with the show in the latter half of the decade.

In the mid 1980s, she again succeeded Elaine Paige, as Grizabella in the musical Cats both in the West End production at the New London Theatre and subsequently on a UK tour. In 1995, at the age of 50, Webb reprised her leading role in a UK tour of Evita, opposite Chris Corcoran as Che and Duncan Smith as Peron. Despite some criticism over her age, the popularity of the tour, produced by Robert Stigwood and David Land with the orchestrations, stage design and direction of the original 1978 London production, led to it being extended throughout 1996. The beginning of the tour also saw the release of an album entitled Music and Songs from Evita as part of Pickwick Records' The Shows Collection series to which Webb contributed a number of tracks.

Between July and September 1997, Webb appeared in Divorce Me, Darling, the sequel to The Boyfriend, at the Chichester Festival Theatre. The cast also included her former husband Tim Flavin.

In 2003, she joined the UK touring production of The King and I, taking over from Stefanie Powers in the role of Anna Leonowens opposite Ronobir Lahiri as The King. Elaine Paige, Webb's predecessor in Evita and Cats had appeared in the London version of the production three years earlier. Later in 2003, she appeared in the original London stage production of Thoroughly Modern Millie uniquely alternating the role of Mrs Meers with Maureen Lipman, to allow Lipman to care for her terminally ill husband, the English playwright Jack Rosenthal.

At the beginning of the following year, she again reprised her role in Tell Me on a Sunday, first for a limited run before the closure of the show in the West End and subsequently on tour. The show had been substantially rewritten for a production starring Denise Van Outen, but a combination of the new and original scores was created specifically for Webb. She appeared in many of the principal venues on the tour, but in other locations the show was performed by Faye Tozer and Patsy Palmer.

In 2007, Webb performed alongside Sheila Ferguson and Rula Lenska in a UK touring production of Hot Flush, a new musical about the menopause. She played Helen, a middle-aged widow whose daughter had recently left home. She also appeared on Elaine Paige on Sunday, a show on BBC Radio 2, during which she selected a number of 'Essential Musicals'.

From September to December 2008, she appeared as Mrs Johnstone in the long-running UK tour of Willy Russell's musical Blood Brothers, succeeding Linda Nolan who left due to illness. The producer of the show, Bill Kenwright had been trying to persuade Webb to play the role for around 20 years and she was only free by chance. As Nolan was ill, she had just a week and a half to rehearse, around half the time normally expected for the rehearsal of such a tour. Birmingham-born Niki Evans was playing the role in the West End at the time, so while the tour visited Birmingham, Webb briefly took over in the London production to allow Evans to play her home city.

Webb starred as Aunt Eller in Oklahoma!, touring the UK throughout 2011. Mark Evans, who had previously appeared in the BBC show Your Country Needs You, played Curly.

Throughout 2012 Webb appeared as Dorothy Brock, a past-her-prime Prima Donna in a UK tour of 42nd Street. Dave Willetts and Bruce Montague also toured with the cast.

Recent work 
In 2017, she played Jacqueline in the first UK tour of the musical La Cage Aux Folles opposite John Partridge and Adrian Zmed, produced by Bill Kenwright.

In July and August 2018, Webb appeared opposite Tommy Steele in The Glenn Miller Story at the London Coliseum.

From January until August 2020, Webb was to have toured with the play The Cat and the Canary. It was curtailed by the industry-wide shutdown of performances as a result of the Covid-19 pandemic and relaunched in 2021.

In March 2022, she performed in The Unexpected Guest, as part of the Theatre Royal, Windsor's On Air season, which featured semi-staged productions of radio plays.

Pantomime 
During her later career, Webb has spent many Christmas seasons in pantomime in venues throughout the UK, such as 2006 where she played the Fairy Godmother in Snow White and the Seven Dwarfs at Theatre Royal, Windsor. She performed in the 1987 London Palladium pantomime, Babes in the Wood, alongside Cannon and Ball, John Inman and Barbara Windsor.

In 2018, Webb joined the cast of Dick Whittington at the Theatre Royal, Windsor, to play Fairy Bowbells, for the early part of the show's run. Anita Harris, who had originally been cast in the role, covered for Anne Hegerty's Queen Rat while the latter took part in I'm a Celebrity...Get Me Out of Here! Upon Hegerty's return to the UK, Harris resumed the role of the fairy. She returned to the Theatre Royal, Windsor, from November 2019 until January 2020, to perform in the pantomime Aladdin, alongside Paul Nicholas.

Concert work 
She performed a solo concert at the Warrington Festival in 1985.

Webb co-devised and starred in The Magic of the Musicals, a UK concert tour featuring songs from musical theatre, opposite Opportunity Knocks winner Mark Rattray. The show toured twice in 1991, before two follow up tours in 1992. The gold-selling album of the show was co-produced by Webb's former husband, sound engineer, Tom Button and her outfits designed by Bruce Oldfield. A performance at the Bristol Hippodrome was also filmed and broadcast on BBC Television. This was followed in 1993 by a North American and Canadian tour and numerous UK versions in the following years. In 1999 Dave Willetts was the co-star, followed by Robert Meadmore in 2002. Webb and Meadmore were joined by Wayne Sleep in 2006.

A live recording of her season of cabaret performances with broadcaster David Jacobs at London's Café Royal was released in 1998 as Marti Webb Sings Gershwin: The Love Songs. Featuring material from her earlier Gershwin recording, the album was co-produced by Webb and West End sound designer Mick Potter.

She has performed her cabaret show on a number of P&O cruise ships, including the MV Arcadia in 2009 and 2010.

In 2016, Webb gave a series of solo concerts. She also performed at These Are a Few of My Favourite Songs: with Don Black at the Royal Albert Hall.

From 2016 onwards, Webb has performed a number of cabaret concerts at The Pheasantry, London, including Dreams Lost, Dreams Found, a show in which she performed a mixture of the songs with which she is closely associated and those from shows that she did not have the opportunity to appear in. In January 2021, she will perform the concerts in Malvern.

Television 
Particularly since coming to fame through Tell Me on a Sunday, Webb has regularly performed on British television. In the 70s and 80s she appeared in the BBC's TV show, The Good Old Days, performing the song 'Sing us One of the old Songs, George' a piece which became her own for the show. Prior to her performance in Evita, though, she appeared in the television series The Songwriters, about songwriting partnerships. The final episode of the series featured Andrew Lloyd Webber and Tim Rice and she first met the pair, briefly, while recording the programme.

Recording
Webb is often thought to have been a one-hit wonder as the success of "Take That Look Off Your Face" has been much more widespread than much of her other work, however, after Tell Me on a Sunday, she recorded a number of solo albums, including some live work, and most recently Limelight featuring a mix of her best known material and then latest productions.

As well as the charity recording of "Ben" in 1985, Webb also contributed to a recording of "Bridge Over Troubled Water" in 1987, which was released in aid of those killed in the Hungerford massacre.

In summer 1987, she released Gershwin on BBC Records, to coincide with the fiftieth anniversary of George Gershwin's death.

In 1990, on the last studio collaboration between Alan Parsons and Eric Woolfson, the album Freudiana, Webb performed two songs: the solo Don't Let the Moment Pass and No One Can Love You Better Than Me in which she joined forces with Woolfson, Gary Howard and Kiki Dee. She also performed background vocals on the album's closing number, There But for the Grace of God Go I.

Technique 
Webb is unusual among musical theatre performers in that she never warms up her voice prior to a performance. She has said she wouldn't recommend this as a technique for other performers. She tries to eat sensibly and dislikes spending time in air-conditioned environments as they dry out the throat. The line in Tell Me on a Sunday, "I long to find a drink that hasn't got an ice cube in it," was included by Don Black in reference to Webb's genuine dislike.

Personal life
Webb married three times and does not have any children. She was married to the actor Alexander Balfour in London in early 1964, but this later ended in divorce.

She married actor Tim Flavin in New York in April 1985 after a courtship of just two weeks but he had a number of affairs during their marriage which ended in divorce in 1986.

She subsequently married sound engineer Tom Button, some two decades her junior, in New York in January 1992. The couple, who met working on a production of Cats, separated some years later.

A keen gardener, during the 1980s, she had house in Fulham, South West London and a country home in Chichester, West Sussex. She then kept an apartment in Westminster, London, for many years. Since the early 1990s, she has lived in a cottage in Langport, Somerset, which she shared with her mother, Selina, before her death. During the 1970s, she owned a 1967 Rolls-Royce Silver Shadow. Webb was at one time a patron of The Players Music Hall Theatre in London, which specialises in Victorian variety theatre.

Webb appeared on the BBC Radio 4 programme Desert Island Discs in May 1982. She selected the "Piano Concerto No.1 in B Flat Minor" by Tchaikovsky; "Una voce poco va" from The Barber of Seville; "The Swan" from The Carnival of the Animals; "Oh Happy Day" by the Edwin Hawkins Singers; "Layla" by Derek and the Dominos; "Bridge Over Troubled Water" by Simon & Garfunkel; and "Space Oddity" by David Bowie. Her favourite selection was a recording of "The Dreaded Batter Pudding Hurler of Bexhill-on-Sea" from The Goon Show. She also chose to take an illustrated dictionary and piano to her imaginary island.

In early 2014, she said that she had been treated for an aggressive form of bowel cancer in 2006, just a month after the death of her mother. The illness wasn't made public at the time and in fact Webb returned to the stage, including dancing in a pantomime, just two months after major surgery.

In a 2016 interview, she described herself as being semi-retired.

Stage appearances

Filmography

Radio

Discography

Solo albums

Cast recordings

Singles

Compilation albums

Guest Appearances

References

1943 births
Living people
English women singers
English musical theatre actresses
English stage actresses
People from Cricklewood
People from Langport
Singers from London
BBC Records artists
Polydor Records artists